The Toyota RVX engine is a series of four-stroke, naturally-aspirated, V10 and V8 racing engines, developed and produced by Toyota for Formula One racing, and used by Toyota, Jordan, Midland, and Williams, from  to .

Applications
Toyota TF101 (never raced)
Toyota TF110 (never raced)

Complete Formula One results

As a chassis constructor
(key)

‡ Half points awarded as less than 75% of race distance was completed.

As an engine supplier
(key)

† Driver did not finish the Grand Prix, but was classified as he completed over 90% of the race distance.
‡ Half points awarded as less than 75% of race distance was completed.

References

 
RVX
Formula One engines
Gasoline engines by model
V10 engines
V8 engines